Emel may refer to:

Emel (magazine), a British Muslim lifestyle magazine
EMEL Fashion, US based fashion designing firm co-founded by Taiwanese fashion designer Michelle Liu and Ken Wu in Los Angeles, CA.

People
Emel Aykanat (born 1975), Turkish-Swiss singer, popularly known as "Emel"
Emel Dereli (born 1996), Turkish shot putter
Emel Etem Toshkova (born 1958), Bulgarian politician of Turkish descent
Emel Heinreich (born 1962), Austrian actress
Emel Mathlouthi, Tunisian singer also known as Emel
Emel Say (1927-2011) Turkish painter
Emel Sayın (born 1945), Turkish singer
Emel Türkyılmaz (born 1992), Turkish basketball player
Emel Vardar, Turkish artist

Turkish feminine given names